The Maryland Sprint Stakes is a Grade III American Thoroughbred horse race for three-year-olds and older over a distance of six furlongs run annually in mid May on Preakness Stakes day at Pimlico Race Course in Baltimore, Maryland.

History

The inaugural running of the event was on 13 June 1987 as the Maryland Budweiser Breeders' Cup Handicap at Laurel Park Racecourse over a distance of seven furlongs. Between 1987 and 2006, the Breeders' Cup sponsored the event while Budweiser sponsored the event from 1987 to 1995 which reflected in the name of the event.

Since its second running, the race has been run on the Preakness Stakes undercard at Pimlico racetrack over a distance of six furlongs.  

The race was first awarded graded status by the by the American Graded Stakes Committee of the Thoroughbred Owners and Breeders Association in 1994.

The event was changed to the Maryland Sprint Stakes in 2017 when the conditions of the race were modified to be stakes with allowance weight conditions.

The event was the lead off leg of the Mid Atlantic Thoroughbred Championships Sprint Dirt Division or MATCh Races, a series of five races in five separate thoroughbred divisions run throughout four Mid-Atlantic States. 

Due to the COVID-19 pandemic in the United States the Preakness Carnival was moved to October and the event was not scheduled.

Records
Speed record:  
 6 furlongs – 1:09.07 - Forest Wildcat (1996)

Margins:
  lengths – Snow Ridge (2002)

Most wins:
 No horse has won this race more than once.

Most wins by a jockey:
 3 - Jerry Bailey (1993, 1998, 1999)
 3 - Edgar Prado (1994, 2005, 2008)
 3 - Ricardo Santana Jr. (2017, 2018, 2019)

Most wins by a trainer:
 4 - D. Wayne Lukas (1995, 1999, 2002, 2012)

Most wins by an owner:
 2 - Overbrook Farm (1995, 2002)

Winners

Notes:

§ Ran as an entry

See also 
 Maryland Sprint Handicap "top three finishers" and starters
 List of American and Canadian Graded races

External sites
 Pimlico Race Course official website

References

Graded stakes races in the United States
1987 establishments in Maryland
Pimlico Race Course
Horse races in Maryland
Recurring sporting events established in 1987
Grade 3 stakes races in the United States